The following is a list of notable deaths in August 2016.

Entries for each day are listed alphabetically by surname. A typical entry lists information in the following sequence:
Name, age, country of citizenship and reason for notability, established cause of death, reference.

August 2016

1
Queen Anne of Romania, 92, French-born Romanian royal.
Frank Blas, 75, Guamanian politician, Lieutenant Governor (1987–1995), cancer.
Peter Paul Brennan, 75, American Old Catholic prelate, Archbishop of New York.
Oscar Celli Gerbasi, 70, Venezuelan politician, Governor of Carabobo (1985–1989).
Dai Dower, 83, Welsh Olympic flyweight boxer (1952) and European champion (1955).
Trayan Dyankov, 40, Bulgarian football player and manager (FC Spartak Varna). 
Andre Hajdu, 84, Hungarian-born Israeli composer and educator (Tel Aviv University, Bar-Ilan University).
Yabezi Kiiza, 78, Ugandan politician, Prime Minister of Bunyoro (2009–2012).
Jonathan D. Krane, 65, American film producer (Face/Off, Look Who's Talking, Michael).
Harrie Langman, 85, Dutch politician, Minister of Economic Affairs (1971–1973).
Louis Marriott, 81, Jamaican actor, director, writer and broadcaster.
Jim Northrup, 73, American Ojibwe writer, kidney cancer.
Raimundo Ongaro, 91, Argentine union leader (CGTA).
Allen K. Ono, 82, American army lieutenant general.
Sir Derek Oulton, 89, British civil servant, Permanent Secretary of the Lord Chancellor's Department and Clerk of the Crown in Chancery (1982–1989).
George Brigars Williams, 87, Ghanaian actor.

2
Terence Bayler, 86, New Zealand actor (Monty Python's Life of Brian, Time Bandits, Harry Potter and the Philosopher's Stone).
Jonathan Borwein, 65, Scottish mathematician.
Tony Chater, 86, British newspaper editor and communist activist.
Forbes Carlile, 95, Australian swimming coach and modern pentathlete.
Gordon Danby, 86, American physicist and inventor.
John Fox, 87, English cricketer.
James Martin Hayes, 92, Canadian Roman Catholic prelate, Archbishop of Halifax (1967–1990).
David Huddleston, 85, American actor (The Big Lebowski, Blazing Saddles, Santa Claus: The Movie), heart and kidney disease.
Gert Kölli, 76, Austrian Olympian 
René Landry, 79, Canadian politician.
Robert Mabro, 81, Egyptian economist.
Franciszek Macharski, 89, Polish Roman Catholic cardinal, Archbishop of Kraków (1979–2005).
Juan Carlos Mesa, 86, Argentine humorist.
Álvaro Pérez Intriago, 79, Ecuadorian politician, member of the National Congress (1984–1986, 1996–2002), Mayor of Quito (1978–1982).
Greg Stemrick, 64, American football player (Houston Oilers), heart attack.
Neil Wilkinson, 61, English footballer (Blackburn Rovers, Port Vale, Crewe Alexandra).
Ahmed Zewail, 70, Egyptian-American scientist, laureate of the Nobel Prize in Chemistry (1999).

3
Shahram Amiri, 38, Iranian nuclear scientist, execution by hanging.
Chris Amon, 73, New Zealand motor racing driver, cancer.
Mansueto Bianchi, 66, Italian Roman Catholic prelate, Bishop of Volterra (2000–2006) and Pistoia (2006–2014). 
Elizabeth Colson, 99, American social anthropologist.
Russell Coughlin, 56, Welsh footballer (Carlisle, Plymouth, Swansea), traffic collision.
Louis Herman, 86, American marine biologist, bile duct cancer.
Mel Hurtig, 84, Canadian publisher and political activist, pneumonia.
Abdul Jeelani, 62, American basketball player (Portland Trail Blazers, Dallas Mavericks).
Blake Krikorian, 48, American businessman and entrepreneur, founder of Slingbox, heart attack.
Steve LaTourette, 62, American politician, member of the U.S. House of Representatives for Ohio's 14th district (1995–2013), pancreatic cancer.
Ricci Martin, 62, American musician.
Shakira Martin, 30, American-born Jamaican model and beauty queen, Miss Jamaica Universe (2011), sickle-cell disease.
Robert Rosencrans, 89, American businessman, chairman of C-SPAN.
Irving Sablosky, 92, American diplomat.
Elliot Tiber, 81, American artist and writer (Taking Woodstock: A True Story of a Riot, a Concert and a Life), stroke.

4
Jean Antone, 73, American professional wrestler (AWA, AJW, CSW).
Eugene Atkinson, 89, American politician, member of the United States House of Representatives from Pennsylvania's 25th congressional district (1979–1983).
Bruce Burrell, 63, Australian murderer, liver and lung cancer.
Peggy Cramer, 79, American baseball player (AAGPBL).
David Dudley Dowd, Jr., 87, American federal judge, member of the U.S. District Court for the Northern District of Ohio (1982–1996).
Patrice Munsel, 91, American coloratura soprano.
Albert Nicholas, 85, American businessman and philanthropist.
Robert Ramsay, 42, American baseball player (Seattle Mariners), seizure.
Snaffu Rigor, 69, Filipino singer and songwriter, lung cancer.
Craven C. Rogers Jr., 81, American air force lieutenant general. 
Gaspar Saladino, 88, American comic letterer (Superman vs. Muhammad Ali, Arkham Asylum).
Zinaida Sharko, 87, Russian stage actress.
Likas Tarigan, 92, Indonesian politician, member of the People's Consultative Assembly (1978–1988).
Charles Toubé, 58, Cameroonian footballer (Tonnerre Yaoundé, national team).
Ducksy Walsh, 50, Irish handball player.

5
Hans-Jürgen Appelrath, 64, German educator (University of Oldenburg).
David Attwooll, 67, British poet and publisher, Erdheim–Chester disease.
Shamim Ara, 78, Pakistani actress and director.
Alan Bates, 71, American physician and politician, member of the Oregon House of Representatives (2001–2005) and Senate (since 2005).
Mahim Bora, 92, Indian writer, brain haemorrhage.
Leslie Brown, 61, American historian, leukemia.
Sir Robin Chichester-Clark, 88, British politician, MP for Londonderry (1955–1974).
Joe Davis, 75, Scottish footballer (Hibernian, Carlisle United).
Don Donnithorne, 90, New Zealand architect.
Joellyn Duesberry, 72, American landscape artist, pancreatic cancer.
Alphons Egli, 91, Swiss politician, member of the Federal Council (1983–1989).
Richard Fagan, 69, American songwriter and musician, liver cancer.
Harold Hillman, 85, British scientist, heart failure. 
Eleuterio Fernández Huidobro, 74, Uruguayan politician, Minister of Defence (since 2011), respiratory problems.
Vander Lee, 50, Brazilian singer-songwriter.
Leovigildo López Fitoria, 89, Nicaraguan Roman Catholic prelate, Bishop of Granada (1972–2003).
Ines Mandl, 98, Austrian-born American biochemist.
George E. Mendenhall, 99, American Biblical scholar.
Annet Nieuwenhuyzen, 85, Dutch actress.
Sir Leonard Peach, 83, British civil servant, Chief Executive of the National Health Service (1986–1989).
Stuart D. B. Picken, 74, Scottish philosopher, academic, and cleric.
Erling Ree-Pedersen, 94, Norwegian civil servant, Director of Tax Administration (1976–1982).
Salvador Q. Quizon, 91, Filipino Roman Catholic prelate, Auxiliary Bishop of Lipa (1979–2002).
John Alan Robinson, 86, British philosopher, mathematician and computer scientist.
Howard Schachman, 97, American biochemist, pneumonia.

6
Guillermo Anderson, 54, Honduran singer, thyroid cancer.
Sid Applebaum, 92, American businessman, co-founder of Rainbow Foods.
José Becerra, 80, Mexican bantamweight boxer, world champion (1959–1960).
Philip Bialowitz, 90, Polish Holocaust survivor and resistance fighter.
Chow Lien-hwa, 96, Chinese Baptist minister and theologian.
Helen Delich Bentley, 92, American politician, member of the U.S. House of Representatives for Maryland's 2nd district (1985–1995), brain cancer.
Joani Blank, 79, American entrepreneur (Good Vibrations), Butterfly vibrator inventor, author and feminist sex educator.
Alfredo Bowman, 82, Honduran herbalist.
Art Demmas, 83, American football official.
Alan Dossor, 74, British theatre director.
Kenneth Durham, 62, British educationalist, headmaster of University College School.
Midget Farrelly, 71, Australian surfer, world champion (1965), stomach cancer.
Pete Fountain, 86, American clarinetist.
Ercole Lupinacci, 82, Italian Catholic hierarch, Bishop of Lungro (1987–2010).
Temple Painter, 83, American harpsichordist and organist.
Ivo Pitanguy, 93, Brazilian plastic surgeon.
Brian Roberts, 71, Australian footballer (Richmond).
Mel Slack, 72, English footballer (Southend United, Cambridge United).
Samuel Robin Spark, 78, Scottish artist.
Vietnam Veedu Sundaram, 76, Indian screenwriter and film director.
Norman Twain, 85, American stage and film producer (Lean on Me, Bajour, My Dog Tulip).
Michael Walter, 57, German Olympic luger (1984, 1988), world champion (1985).
Don Welch, 84, American poet and academic. 
Jan Wilsgaard, 86, Norwegian-born Swedish automobile designer (Volvo).
Walter C. Young, 91, American politician, member of the Florida House of Representatives (1972–1992).

7
David M. Borden, 79, American jurist, Justice of the Connecticut Supreme Court (1990–2007), pancreatic cancer.
John Boreland, 46, Northern Irish loyalist activist, shot.
Yuri Bregel, 90, Russian historian.
Larry Brink, 92, American football player (Los Angeles Rams).
Gustavo Bueno, 91, Spanish philosopher.
Rodolfo Camacho, 40, Colombian-born Venezuelan cyclist, shot.
Bryan Clauson, 27, American racing driver, race collision.
Mito Croes, 70, Aruban politician.
Joe Duplin, 82, American sailor, world champion (1963).
H. F. Gierke III, 73, American judge. 
Jack Günthard, 96, Swiss gymnast, Olympic champion (1952).
Anđelko Klobučar, 85, Croatian composer and organist.
Sagan Lewis, 62, American actress (St. Elsewhere, Homicide: Life on the Street), cancer.
Hans Ragnemalm, 76, Swedish judge and academic.
Sir Ron Scott, 88, New Zealand sports administrator.
Jack Sears, 86, British race and rally driver.
Peter Stein, 91, British legal scholar.
Roy Summersby, 81, English footballer (Crystal Palace, Millwall, Portsmouth).
B. E. Taylor, 65, American musician ("Vitamin L"), brain cancer.
Ivo Urbančič, 85, Slovenian philosopher.
Janus van der Zande, 91, Dutch Olympic marathon runner (1952).
Dolores Vargas, 80, Spanish singer, complications of leukemia.
Ruby Winters, 74, American soul singer ("Make Love to Me", "I Will").

8
Nikola Anastasov, 84, Bulgarian actor.
Ali Baba, 76, Pakistani writer.
Mikhail Bariban, 67, Russian Olympic triple jumper (1972).
Doris Bohrer, 93, American intelligence operative.
Mike Brumley, 78, American baseball player (Washington Senators).
Makandal Daaga, 80, Trinidadian political activist.
Edward Daly, 82, Northern Irish Roman Catholic prelate, Bishop of Derry (1974–1993).
Željko Kopanja, 61, Bosnian newspaper editor, heart attack. 
Jyothi Lakshmi, 63, Indian actress, leukemia.
Vijaya Nandasiri, 72, Sri Lankan actor and dramatist.
Lin Shllaku, 78, Albanian footballer (Partizani Tirana, national team), lung disease.
Klaus Weber, 80, German biologist.
George Yarno, 58, American football player (Tampa Bay Buccaneers, Atlanta Falcons, Houston Oilers), stomach cancer.

9
Bill Alsup, 78, American race car driver, crane accident.
Panchu Arunachalam, 76, Indian film writer (Kazhugu, Paayum Puli) and director (Manamagale Vaa), cardiac arrest.
Miguel José Asurmendi Aramendía, 76, Spanish Roman Catholic prelate, Bishop of Tarazona (1990–1995) and Vitoria (1995–2016).
Susan Baer, 65, American transportation executive, cancer.
Karl Bögelein, 89, German football player and coach (VfB Stuttgart). 
Barendra Krushna Dhal, 77, Indian journalist.
Bill Dooley, 82, American football coach (North Carolina Tar Heels, Virginia Tech Hokies, Wake Forest Demon Deacons).
Gerald Grosvenor, 6th Duke of Westminster, 64, British billionaire property developer, heart attack.
Fabio Garriba, 71, Italian actor (Slap the Monster on Page One).
Siegbert Horn, 66, German slalom canoeist, Olympic champion (1972).
Barry Jenner, 75, American actor (Star Trek: Deep Space Nine, Dallas, Family Matters), acute myeloid leukemia.
Aftab Ghulam Nabi Kazi, 96, Pakistani politician, Governor of the State Bank of Pakistan (1978–1986).
Bob Kiley, 80, American public transport planner, Alzheimer's disease.
Jimmy Levine, 61–62, American R&B musician and record producer.
Jimmy D. Long, 84, American politician, member of the Louisiana State Legislature (1968–2000), traffic collision.
W. Carter Merbreier, 90, American television personality (Captain Noah and His Magical Ark).
Ernst Neizvestny, 91, Russian-American sculptor.
Kalikho Pul, 47, Indian politician, Chief Minister of Arunachal Pradesh (2016) and MLA for Hayuliang (since 1995), suicide by hanging.
Philippe Roberts-Jones, 91, Belgian art historian.
Wang Tuoh, 72, Taiwanese writer and politician, MLY for Keelung (1996–2008), complications of a heart attack.

10
Neill Armstrong, 90, American football player (Philadelphia Eagles) and coach (Edmonton Eskimos, Chicago Bears).
John Bennett, 84, Irish hurler (Cork).
Des Calverley, 96, Australian football player (Fitzroy, Richmond).
Lovell Coleman, 78, American-born Canadian football player (Calgary Stampeders).
C. Welborn Daniel, 90, American politician and judge.
Walter Hollenweger, 89, Swiss theologian and author.
Donald Lee, 83, South African cricketer.
John H. Moore, 77, American anthropologist.
Kenneth Osterberger, 86, American politician, member of the Louisiana Senate (1972–1992).
Harold Peterman, 74, American politician, member of the Delaware House of Representatives (since 2011).
Steve Pivovar, 63, American sports journalist (Omaha World-Herald).
John Saunders, 61, Canadian-born American sports journalist (ESPN, The Sports Reporters) and broadcaster (ESPN on ABC).
Sasi Shanker, 57, Indian film director (Kunjikoonan).
Cynthia Szigeti, 66, American actress (National Lampoon's European Vacation, Seinfeld, Curb Your Enthusiasm), idiopathic pulmonary fibrosis.
James J. Tietjen, 83, American scientist and businessman.
Ideler Tonelli, 91, Argentine politician.
Gerhard Tötschinger, 70, Austrian actor, pulmonary embolism.
Tom Wilson, 72, American football player and coach (Texas A&M Aggies), cancer.

11
Hamdi Al Banbi, 80, Egyptian businessman and politician, Petroleum Minister (1991–1999).
Roly Bain, 62, English priest and clown.
Charles Bawden, 92, British Mongolist.
Leon Donohue, 77, American football player (San Francisco 49ers, Dallas Cowboys).
James B. Dunn, 89, American politician, member of the South Dakota Senate (1973–2000).
Elmo Fernando, 75, Sri Lankan broadcaster.
Paul Friedrich, 88, American anthropologist and linguist.
Hanif Mohammad, 81, Pakistani cricketer (national team).
Sigbjørn Ravnåsen, 74, Norwegian politician. 
Francesco Sgalambro, 82, Italian Roman Catholic prelate, Bishop of Cefalù (2000–2009).
Len Steckler, 88, American photographer, illustrator and filmmaker.
Thomas Steinbeck, 72, American writer and war photographer, chronic obstructive pulmonary disease.
Sir Ian Turbott, 94, New Zealand diplomat, Administrator of Antigua (1958–1964) and Grenada (1964–1967).
Glenn Yarbrough, 86, American folk singer ("Baby the Rain Must Fall", "It's Gonna Be Fine", "San Francisco Bay Blues").

12
Keith Blunt, 77, English football coach (Sutton United, Malmö, Viking), cancer.
Paul Kraabel, 83, American politician, member of the Washington House of Representatives (1971–1975), subdural hematoma.
Juan Pedro de Miguel, 58, Spanish Olympic handball player (1980, 1984).
Gonzalo Monte-Manibog, 86, Filipino Olympic wrestler.
Alison Piepmeier, 43, American writer, brain cancer.
Ljubomir Popović, 81, Serbian painter.
Halambage Premasiri, 52, Sri Lankan cricket player and administrator.
Sir Swinton Thomas, 85, British judge. 
Ruby Wilson, 68, American blues, soul and gospel singer, heart attack.

13
Kenny Baker, 81, British actor (Star Wars, Time Bandits, Flash Gordon).
Ettore Bernabei, 95, Italian television director and producer.
Miguel Bortolini, 74, Mexican politician, cancer.
Connie Crothers, 75, American jazz pianist, cancer.
Patricia English, 84, British actress (The Avengers).
Gita Hall, 82, Swedish-American actress (The Gun Runners).
Allen Kelley, 83, American basketball player, Olympic champion (1960).
Pramukh Swami Maharaj, 94, Indian religious leader.
Françoise Mallet-Joris, 86, Belgian writer.
Emidio Massi, 94, Italian politician, President of Marche (1978–1990).
S. P. Sarguna Pandian, 75, Indian politician.
Michel Richard, 68, French-born American chef, complications from a stroke.
Adi Sasono, 73, Indonesian politician, Minister of Cooperatives and Small Businesses (1998–1999).
Joyce Carol Thomas, 78, American poet, playwright, motivational speaker, and author.
Liam Tuohy, 83, Irish football player and manager (Shamrock Rovers, Newcastle United, national team).
Holger Ursin, 82, Norwegian physician.

14
Marion Christopher Barry, 36, American construction company owner, drug overdose.
Bi Chunfang, 89, Chinese Yue opera performer.
Neil Black, 84, English oboist.
Raphael Cheenath, 81, Indian Roman Catholic prelate, Archbishop of Cuttack-Bhubaneswar (1985–2011).
DJ Official, 39, American hip hop musician, bone marrow cancer.
Fyvush Finkel, 93, American actor (Picket Fences, Boston Public, A Serious Man), Emmy winner (1994).
Robert Goff, Baron Goff of Chieveley, 89, British judge and law lord.
Aboud Jumbe, 96, Tanzanian politician, President of Zanzibar (1972–1984).
Hermann Kant, 90, German writer.
Ron Vander Kelen, 76, American football player (Minnesota Vikings, Wisconsin Badgers), MVP of the 1963 Rose Bowl.
Horst Meyer, 90, Swiss physicist.
Ken Meyer, 91, American football coach (San Francisco 49ers).
Na. Muthukumar, 41, Indian lyricist, jaundice.
Edgar Peltenburg, 74, Canadian archaeologist.
Lorenzo Piani, 60, Italian singer and songwriter.
Sohail Qaiser, 51, Pakistani squash player, world champion (1985), cancer.
Yasumitsu Toyoda, 81, Japanese baseball player (Saitama Seibu Lions, Tokyo Yakult Swallows), pneumonia.
James Woolley, 49, American keyboardist (Nine Inch Nails, 2wo), Grammy winner (1993).

15
Hotaru Akane, 32, Japanese pornographic actress.
Dennis Akumu, 82, Kenyan politician, MP for Nyakach (1969–1973, 1992–1997).
Dick Assman, 82, Canadian gas station manager.
Dalian Atkinson, 48, English footballer (Ipswich Town, Aston Villa), tased.
Mauril Bélanger, 61, Canadian politician, MP for Ottawa—Vanier (since 1995), amyotrophic lateral sclerosis.
Choo-Choo Coleman, 78, American baseball player (New York Mets, Philadelphia Phillies), cancer.
Sarath de Abrew, 63, Sri Lankan judge.
Solange Fasquelle, 83, French writer.
Stefan Henze, 35, German canoeist and coach, Olympic silver medalist (2004), traffic collision.
Joseph Hone, 79, Irish spy writer.
Bobby Hutcherson, 75, American jazz musician, emphysema.
Harold Kalina, 88, American politician.
Alison Kelly, 102, English art historian. 
Monique Koeyers-Felida, 49, Curaçaoan politician, member of the Estates of Curaçao (2010–2015).
T. A. Razzaq, 58, Indian screenwriter (Perumazhakkalam).
Bambi Sheleg, 58, Chilean-born Israeli journalist and magazine editor, cancer.
Makhenkesi Stofile, 71, South African politician and diplomat, Premier of the Eastern Cape (1997–2004), Minister of Sport and Recreation (2004–2010), Ambassador to Germany (since 2011).
Richard Wackar, 88, American football and basketball coach (Rowan Profs).

16
Jean-Guy Allard, 68, Canadian journalist and author.
Bev Barnes, 65, Canadian Olympic basketball player.
Andrew Florent, 45, Australian tennis player, colorectal cancer.
*Jorge García Isaza, 88, Colombian Roman Catholic prelate, Vicar Apostolic of Tierradentro (1989–2003).
Charti Lal Goel, 89, Indian politician.
João Havelange, 100, Brazilian football executive, President of FIFA (1974–1998).
John McLaughlin, 89, American political commentator and television personality (The McLaughlin Group).
Jemma Redmond, 38, Irish biotechnologist.
Luis Álvaro de Oliveira Ribeiro, 73, Brazilian businessman, President of Santos FC (2010–2014).
Richard Seminack, 74, American Ukrainian Catholic hierarch, Bishop of Saint Nicholas of Chicago (since 2003), cancer.
Gurdial Singh, 83, Indian writer.
Ken Thornett, 78, Australian rugby league player (Parramatta Eels, national team, Leeds).
John Timoney, 68, Irish-born American police officer, chief of Miami Police Department (2003–2010), Commissioner of the Philadelphia Police Department (1998–2002), lung cancer.

17
George Anthan, 80, American journalist, cardiac arrest.
Steve Arlin, 70, American baseball player (San Diego Padres, Cleveland Indians).
James R. Bennett, 76, American politician, Secretary of State of Alabama (1993–2003, 2013–2015), cancer.
Thomas Cholmondeley, 48, Kenyan farmer and landowner, complications after surgery.
Baby Dalupan, 92, Filipino basketball coach (Crispa, Great Taste, Purefoods), pneumonia.
John Ellenby, 75, British computer scientist.
John Fischer, 86, Belgian-born American pianist and composer, stroke.
Katharine Blodgett Gebbie, 84, American astrophysicist.
Nachum Heiman, 82, Latvian-born Israeli composer, recipient of the Israel Prize (2009).
Arthur Hiller, 92, Canadian-born American film director (Love Story, The Hospital, The In-Laws), President of AMPAS (1993–1997).
Barry Hollowell, 68, Canadian Anglican prelate, Bishop of Calgary (1999–2005).
William Landles, 92, Scottish sculptor.
Víctor Mora, 85, Spanish comic book writer.
Barry Myers, 79, British advertising filmmaker. 
Mool Singh, 63, Indian politician, Madhya Pradesh MLA for Raghogarh (1985–1989, 2008–2013), heart attack.
Renuka Sinha, 67, Indian politician, MP for Cooch Behar (since 2014), heart attack.
Shelby Westbrook, 94, American World War II pilot (Tuskegee Airmen).

18
René Bonino, 86, French Olympic sprinter (1952, 1956), silver medalist at 1954 European Championship.
Rovshan Janiyev, 41, Azerbaijani-Russian criminal, shot.
Machali, 20, Indian tigress.
Maxon Mbendera, 57, Malawian judge and chairperson of the Malawi Electoral Commission.
Jérôme Monod, 85, French political advisor.
Michael Napier Brown, 79, British actor, theatre director and playwright.
Ernst Nolte, 93, German historian.
Jan van Cauwelaert, 102, Belgian-Congolese Roman Catholic prelate, Bishop of Inongo (1954–1967).
John William Vessey Jr., 94, American military officer, Chairman of the Joint Chiefs of Staff (1982–1985).

19
Trevor Baker, 94, British meteorologist.
Subrata Banerjee, 71, Indian cricket umpire.
Judes Bicaba, 69, Burkinabe Roman Catholic prelate, Bishop of Dédougou (since 2005).
Peter Blundell Jones, 67, British architect and architectural historian.
Bob Cupp, 76, American golf course designer.
Adrian Enescu, 68, Romanian composer.
Anthony Evans, 73, South African cricketer.
Jay S. Fishman, 63, American business executive, CEO of Travelers, amyotrophic lateral sclerosis.
Donald Henderson, 87, American physician, smallpox eradication program director, broken hip complications.
Prince Marco of Hohenlohe-Langenburg, 54, Spanish nobleman.
Éva Lindner, 90, Hungarian Olympic skater (1948).
Edward T. Maloney, 88, American aviation historian.
John Penn Mayberry, 77, American mathematical philosopher.
Colin O'Brien, 76, British photographer.
Lou Pearlman, 62, American record producer, music manager (Backstreet Boys, NSYNC) and convicted criminal, cardiac arrest.
Nina Ponomaryova, 87, Russian discus thrower, Olympic champion (1952, 1960).
Krzysztof Ptak, 62, Polish cinematographer (Pornografia).
Jack Riley, 80, American actor (The Bob Newhart Show, Rugrats, Spaceballs), pneumonia.
Horacio Salgán, 100, Argentine tango musician.
Mohammad Ali Samatar, 81, Somali politician, Prime Minister (1987–1990).
Bob Skelton, 81, New Zealand jockey, bowel cancer.
Danus Skene, 72, Scottish politician.
Derek Smith, 85, British jazz pianist.
Mira Stupica, 93, Serbian actress (Parada).

20
Sam Bawlf, 72, Canadian politician and author, MLA (1976–1979).
Judith-Marie Bergan, 67, American actress, cancer.
Detlev Blanke, 75, German Esperantist. 
Lilia Cuntapay, 81, Filipino actress (Shake, Rattle & Roll, Brokedown Palace, Six Degrees of Separation from Lilia Cuntapay).
George E. Curry, 69, American journalist, heart failure.
Daniela Dessì, 59, Italian opera singer, cancer.
Irving Fields, 101, American pianist.
Jim Gibbons, 79, American football player (Detroit Lions), double pneumonia.
Harry Gilmer, 90, American football player (Washington Redskins, Detroit Lions).
Richard P. Korf, 91, American mycologist.
Charles-Émile Loo, 94, French politician, member of the European Parliament (1979–1989) and the National Assembly (1967–1968, 1973–1978).
Eugeniusz Geno Malkowski, 73, Polish artist.
John J. McGlynn, 94, American politician.
Ignacio Padilla, 47, Mexican writer, traffic collision.
Joseph A. Palaia, 89, American politician, member of the New Jersey Senate (1989–2008).
Luis Rodolfo Peñaherrera Bermeo, 80, Ecuadorian artist.
Brian Rix, Baron Rix, 92, British actor (And the Same to You) and activist (Mencap).
Morton Schindel, 98, American film producer.
Louis Smith, 85, American jazz trumpeter.
Louis Stewart, 72, Irish jazz guitarist.
Morris A. Wessel, 98, American pediatrician.
M. K. Wren, 78, American science fiction writer.

21
Headley Bennett, 85, Jamaican saxophonist.
Abd al-Rahman Fakhri, 79, Yemeni poet and literary critic.
Basia Frydman, 70, Polish-born Swedish actress (The Slingshot).
Peter deCourcy Hero, 73, American philanthropy consultant, esophageal cancer.
Morihiko Hiramatsu, 92, Japanese politician, Governor of Ōita Prefecture (1979–2003).
Sir Antony Jay, 86, English broadcaster, director and writer (Yes Minister). 
Per Lønning, 88, Norwegian Lutheran bishop and politician, MP (1958–1965).
Marin Moraru, 79, Romanian actor.
Norma Moriceau, 72, Australian costume designer (Mad Max 2, "Crocodile" Dundee, Patriot Games).
Mario Novelli, 76, Italian actor.
Benet Rossell, 78, Spanish artist, amyotrophic lateral sclerosis.
Guido Schmidt-Chiari, 84, Austrian banker (Creditanstalt).
Rab Stewart, 54, Scottish footballer (Dunfermline Athletic, Motherwell, Falkirk).
Hanako Tokachi, 70, Japanese actress.

22
Farid Ali, 71, Bangladeshi actor.
Michael Brooks, 58, American basketball player (La Salle, San Diego Clippers, Indiana Pacers), stroke.
Jordi Carbonell, 92, Spanish politician, President of ERC (1996–2004).
Jackson B. Davis, 98, American politician, member of the Louisiana State Legislature (1956–1980).
Girolamo Grillo, 86, Italian Roman Catholic prelate, Bishop of Civitavecchia-Tarquinia (1983–2006). 
Paul Landreaux, 72, American college basketball coach (El Camino College, Saint Mary's)
Michael Leader, 78, British actor (EastEnders, Star Wars, Doctor Who).
Li Yinyuan, 97, Chinese physicist and academician (Chinese Academy of Sciences). 
Liu Dajun, 90, Chinese agricultural scientist, educator and academician (Chinese Academy of Engineering). 
Edward Malefakis, 84, American history professor.
V. S. Mani, 74, Indian legal scholar.
Don McIver, 80, New Zealand military officer, Chief of General Staff (1987–1989), director of the New Zealand Security Intelligence Service (1991–1999).
S. R. Nathan, 92, Singaporean politician, President (1999–2011), stroke.
Geneton Moraes Neto, 60, Brazilian writer and journalist, aortic aneurysm.
Jacqueline Pagnol, 95, French actress (Topaze).
Charlie Sands, 68, American baseball player (Pittsburgh Pirates, California Angels).
Gilli Smyth, 83, English singer (Gong).
Toots Thielemans, 94, Belgian jazz guitarist, whistler and harmonica player (Man Bites Harmonica!).
Jane Thompson, 89, American designer and architect, cancer.

23
Andreas Barkoulis, 80, Greek actor.
Tekin Bilge, 85–86, Turkish Olympic footballer.
Barry Chamish, 64, Canadian-born Israeli writer.
Bryan Clutterbuck, 56, American baseball player (Milwaukee Brewers), colon cancer.
Dennis Hackett, 87, British journalist and editor (Queen, Nova, Today).
Mohammad Heydari, 79, Iranian musician and songwriter, cancer.
Steven Hill, 94, American actor (Mission: Impossible, Law & Order, The Firm).
Esther Jungreis, 80, Hungarian-born American religious leader, founder of Hineni, pneumonia.
William McAllister-Johnson, 77, Canadian academic.
André Melançon, 74, Canadian film director.
Berit Mørdre, 76, Norwegian cross-country skier, Olympic champion (1968).
Evita Muñoz, 79, Mexican actress, pneumonia.
Jeremiah Joseph O'Keefe, 93, American World War II pilot ace and politician, mayor of Biloxi, Mississippi (1973–1981).
Gerald J. Oppenheimer, 94, American librarian and academic.
Tony Pasquesi, 83, American football player (Chicago Cardinals).
Joseph Chilton Pearce, 90, American author.
Aaron W. Plyler, 89, American politician.
Mercedes Pulido, 78, Venezuelan politician and diplomat.
Edgar Schoen, 91, American physician.
Reinhard Selten, 85, German economist, winner of the Nobel Memorial Prize in Economic Sciences (1994).
Henri de Turenne, 94, French journalist and screenwriter.
Ria Vedder-Wubben, 65, Dutch politician, member of the Senate (2003–2011).
Elsie Wayne, 84, Canadian politician, MP from Saint John (1993–2004).
Antônio Eliseu Zuqueto, 86, Brazilian Roman Catholic prelate, Bishop of Teixeira de Freitas-Caravelas (1983–2005).

24
Juan Bell, 48, Dominican baseball player (Baltimore Orioles, Philadelphia Phillies, Milwaukee Brewers), kidney illness.
Joel Bergman, 80, American architect (The Mirage).
Neil Berry, 94, American baseball player (Detroit Tigers, St. Louis Browns).
Michel Butor, 89, French writer.
Glen Evans, 80, New Zealand politician. 
Tom Ganley, 73, American businessman and politician.
Gilles-Gaston Granger, 96, French analytic philosopher.
Laurence Higgins, 87, American Roman Catholic priest.
George Kaczender, 83, Hungarian-born Canadian film director (In Praise of Older Women).
Akhlaqur Rahman Kidwai, 96, Indian politician, Governor of Haryana (2004–2009), Rajasthan (2007), West Bengal (1998–1999), and Bihar (1979–1985, 1993–1998).
Shūgorō Nakazato, 96, Japanese martial artist, aspiration pneumonia.
Walter Scheel, 97, German politician, President of West Germany (1974–1979), Minister for Foreign Affairs (1969–1974) and Vice-Chancellor (1969–1974).
Gregory P. Schmidt, 69, American politician, cancer.
Józef Szymański, 90, Polish Olympic bobsledder.
Roger Y. Tsien, 64, American biochemist, Nobel Prize laureate (2008).
Miguel Varela, 76, Filipino businessman.
Henning Voscherau, 75, German politician, Mayor of Hamburg (1988–1997), brain tumor.
Nina Yeryomina, 82, Russian basketball player, world champion (1959).

25
Dame Margaret Anstee, 90, British diplomat, Director-General of the UN Office in Vienna (1987–1992).
Robert Todd Carroll, 71, American academic, scientific skeptic and writer (The Skeptic's Dictionary), cancer.
James Cronin, 84, American physicist, laureate of the Nobel Prize in Physics (1980).
Paul Dade, 64, American baseball player (Cleveland Indians, San Diego Padres), cancer.
André Dehertoghe, 75, Belgian Olympic middle-distance runner (1968, 1972).
Maria Eugénia, 89, Portuguese actress.
Warren Hinckle, 77, American political journalist, pneumonia.
Rodolfo Illanes, 58, Bolivian politician, beaten.
Marvin Kaplan, 89, American actor (It's a Mad, Mad, Mad, Mad World, Alice, The Great Race).
Anna Kurska, 87, Polish politician, member of the Senate (2001–2007).
Sergey Marchuk, 64, Russian speed skater, European champion (1978).
Wynona Mulcaster, 101, Canadian painter and teacher.
Josef Prokeš, 83, Czech Olympic skier.
Sonia Rykiel, 86, French fashion designer, Parkinson's disease.
Eddy Silitonga, 65, Indonesian singer.
G. Spencer-Brown, 93, English polymath.
Rudy Van Gelder, 91, American recording engineer.

26
Peter Barry, 88, Irish politician, Minister for Foreign Affairs (1982–1987), Tánaiste (1987), TD (1969–1997).
Graham Cairns-Smith, 84, British scientist.
Paul Comi, 84, American actor (Cape Fear, The Towering Inferno, Rawhide).
Hatuey de Camps, 69, Dominican politician, President of the Chamber of Deputies (1979–1982), cancer.
Joe DeMaestri, 87, American baseball player (Philadelphia/Kansas City Athletics, New York Yankees).
James Doyle, 78, American politician, Mayor of Pawtucket, Rhode Island (1997–2011).
Bill Etra, 69, American inventor (Rutt/Etra Video Synthesizer), heart failure.
Harald Grønningen, 81, Norwegian cross-country skier, Olympic champion (1968).
Phyllis Harmon, 99, American cycling advocate.
Steve Korcheck, 84, American baseball player (Washington Senators) and college president (State College of Florida, Manatee–Sarasota), heart failure.
Winfried Menrad, 77, German politician, MEP (1989–2004).
J. Alec Motyer, 91, Irish-born British biblical scholar.
Michael Phillips, British ice dancer. (death announced on this date)
Anton Pronk, 75, Dutch footballer (Ajax, national team), amyotrophic lateral sclerosis.
Martyn Quayle, 57, Manx politician, member of the House of Keys (2001–2011), injuries sustained in a fall.
Davoud Rashidi, 83, Iranian actor.
Jānis Reinis, 55, Latvian actor.
E. Parry Thomas, 95, American banker and businessman.
Jiří Tichý, 82, Czech football player.
Erika Wallner, 70, Argentine actress, kidney failure.

27
Alcindo, 71, Brazilian footballer (Grêmio), diabetes.
Joy Browne, 71, American talk show host.
Ronnie Cope, 81, English football player and manager (Manchester United, Luton Town).
Tamim Chowdhury, 30, Bangladeshi-Canadian emir of ISIL in Bangladesh, shot.
Cookie, 83, Australian-born Major Mitchell's cockatoo, world's oldest parrot, euthanized.
Alan Cuthbert, 84, British pharmacologist.
Jaime Davidovich, 79, Argentine-American artist.
Leon Everitt, 69, American baseball player (San Diego Padres).
Jean-Paul Fouletier, 77, French Olympic weightlifter (1968, 1972).
Cesare Gelli, 83, Italian actor.
Bill Lenkaitis, 70, American football player (New England Patriots), brain cancer.
Zenzo Matsuyama, 91, Japanese screenwriter and director.
Alan Smith, 77, English footballer (Torquay).
Hans Stenberg, 63, Swedish politician, MP (1991–2010).
Peter Stephens, 88, British journalist and newspaper editor.

28
Hubbard Alexander, 77, American football coach (Dallas Cowboys).
Sir Ronald Arculus, 93, British diplomat and businessman, Ambassador to Italy (1979–1983).
Henry Judd Baker, American actor.
Binyamin Ben-Eliezer, 80, Iraqi-born Israeli politician, member of the Knesset (1984–2014), Defense Minister (2001–2002), kidney disease.
Mr. Fuji, 82, American professional wrestler and manager (WWF).
Juan Gabriel, 66, Mexican singer and songwriter, heart attack.
Lennart Häggroth, 76, Swedish ice hockey player, world champion (1962) and Olympic silver medalist (1964).
Joe R. Hicks, 75, American social activist.
Nate Hirsch, 68, American sports broadcaster (Georgia Southern Eagles).
William H. Lacy Jr., 71, American businessman, CEO of MGIC (1987–1999), respiratory failure.
Volodymyr Patyk, 89, Ukrainian artist.
Ken Purchase, 77, British politician, MP (1992–2010).
Shahid Qadri, 74, Bangladeshi poet, kidney disease.
Mohammad Shafi Qureshi, 86, Indian politician, Governor of Madhya Pradesh (1993–1998), Uttar Pradesh (1996, 1998), and Bihar (1991–1993).
Charles Z. Smith, 89, American judge, Justice of the Washington Supreme Court (1988–2002).
Darrell Ward, 52, American reality television personality (Ice Road Truckers), plane crash.

29
Bronisław Baczko, 92, Polish philosopher.
Ken Black, 84, Canadian politician. 
Joan Chambers, 86, Australian politician, member of the Victorian Legislative Assembly for Ballarat South (1979–1982).
Michael Di Pasqua, 63, American jazz drummer.
Dee Dowis, 48, American football player (U.S. Air Force Academy), traffic collision.
Erwin Gabathuler, 83, Northern Irish nuclear physicist.
Nestor Ignat, 98, Romanian journalist.
Yunus Jaffery, 86, Indian Persian scholar.
Harry Jepson, 96, English rugby league administrator.
Tommaso Labranca, 54, Italian writer. 
Edward Latter, 88, New Zealand military officer, politician, MP for Marlborough (1975–1978), and diplomat, High Commissioner to Canada (1980–1985).
Reg Matthewson, 77, English footballer (Sheffield United, Fulham).
Anne O'Brien, 60, Irish footballer (Reims, Lazio, Trani).
Dinanath Pathy, 74, Indian painter and art historian.
Ann Smyrner, 81, Danish actress (Reptilicus).
Vedat Türkali, 97, Turkish playwright, novelist and screenwriter, multiple organ dysfunction.
Gene Wilder, 83, American actor (The Producers, Willy Wonka & the Chocolate Factory, Young Frankenstein) and screenwriter, Emmy winner (2003), complications from Alzheimer's disease.

30
Abu Mohammad al-Adnani, 38/39, Syrian Islamist leader (ISIL in Syria), bombing.
Eleanor Barooshian, 66, American rock musician (The Cake).
Josip Bukal, 70, Bosnian footballer.
Věra Čáslavská, 74, Czech gymnast, Olympic champion (1964, 1968), pancreatic cancer.
Dan Dryden, 72, American politician, member of the South Dakota House of Representatives (since 2011), cancer.
Dave Durie, 85, English footballer (Blackpool, Chester City).
Nabile Farès, 75, Algerian-born French novelist.
Hoot Hester, 65, American fiddle player, cancer.
Frederick King, 93, Canadian politician, MP (1979–1988).
David Lavery, 67, American academic and television historian (Buffy the Vampire Slayer).
Doris McLemore, 89, American teacher, last fluent speaker of the Wichita language.
Marc Riboud, 93, French photographer.
Brian Robinson, 76, New Zealand inorganic chemist.
John Sacher, 76, British retailer (Marks & Spencer).
Joe Sutter, 95, American aeronautical engineer, chief designer of the Boeing 747.

31
Antonino Fernández Rodríguez, 98, Spanish businessman.
Nathan Lyons, 86, American photographer.
B. Daniel Riley, 70, American politician, member of the Maryland House of Delegates (1999–2003, 2007–2011).
Myron Tribus, 94, American organizational theorist.
David H. Trump, 85, British archaeologist.
Brian Wildsmith, 86, English painter and children's book illustrator.
Miles Vaughan Williams, 98, British pharmacologist. 
Kashmiri Lal Zakir, 97, Indian poet and novelist.

References

2016-08
 08